Dasbiyo is a town in southern Djibouti. It is served by a station on the  old Ethio-Djibouti Railways. The surrounding district is rich in both livestock and fledgeling agriculture.

History
The town played an important role in trade between the port cities of Zeila, and the hinterland with houses constructed of mud and stone and some Aqal's. Where nomadics use to stopping here for water on the way to Zeila or Harar. Tumuli and vestiges have been found in and around Daasbiyo, once dynamic and prosperous possessing a well on its bed of wadi which crossed it. It was also a religious crossroads between the 10th and the 12th centuries, Islam only penetrated towards the end of the 13th century, whereas Zeila became much Muslim from the 6th century onwards. According to the twelfth-century Jewish traveler Benjamin of Tudela, the Zeila region was the land of the Havilah, confined by al-Habash in the west.

Overview
Nearby towns and villages include Ali Sabieh, Holhol, Goubetto, Guelile and Ali Adde.

Climate
Dasbiyo has a hot arid climate (BWh) by the Köppen-Geiger system. The town experiences very warm winters and sweltering summers.  Occasionally, Dasbiyo has heavy rains where the precipitation for the entire year will fall over the course of a few days.

Demographics
The population of Dasbiyo has been estimated to be 1,750. The town inhabitants belong to various mainly Afro-Asiatic-speaking ethnic groups, with the Issa Somali predominant.

References

Populated places in Djibouti